Lisa Unterweger (born 4 February 1995) is an Austrian cross-country skier. She competed in the women's sprint at the 2018 Winter Olympics.

Cross-country skiing results
All results are sourced from the International Ski Federation (FIS).

Olympic Games

World Championships

World Cup

Season standings

References

External links
 

1995 births
Living people
Austrian female cross-country skiers
Olympic cross-country skiers of Austria
Cross-country skiers at the 2018 Winter Olympics
Cross-country skiers at the 2022 Winter Olympics
Place of birth missing (living people)
Cross-country skiers at the 2012 Winter Youth Olympics
21st-century Austrian women